The Glasgow Storm are a basketball club based in the city of Glasgow, Scotland.

History
The club was founded in July 2001. The club currently puts out teams at all age levels, from under 12 through to the Senior Men's and Women's teams. The under 12s and under 14s teams were established with the help of National Lottery funding.

Storm Senior Men
The Storm entered the Scottish Men's National League in 2002. Based in the north and west of the city and playing home games latterly at the Kelvin Hall, the team were competitive and a comfortable mid-table team throughout their National League history, with 5th place in 2016-17 their strongest league performance. The Storm withdrew from the Scottish Basketball Championship at the start of the 2019-20 season, while maintaining their junior and local league presence.

Teams
Senior Squads
Senior Men (National League Division 1)
2nd Men (Strathclyde League Division 1)
3rd Men (Strathclyde League Division 2)
4th Men (Strathclyde League Division 3)

Youth Squads
U18 Men (Strathclyde League U18's)
U16 Men (Strathclyde League U16's)

Home arenas
Scotstoun Sports Centre
Glasgow Kelvin College (formerly North Glasgow College)
Kelvin Hall

Season-by-season records

External links

Basketball teams in Scotland
Sports teams in Glasgow
2001 establishments in Scotland
Basketball teams established in 2001